(often stylized in all-caps as MAZDASPEED) was Mazda's in-house performance division. The company was a grassroots racing team in Japan. Owned by Mazda Motor Corporation, they built production model vehicles, became involved in motorsports development, and offered performance parts and accessories. Mazda has phased out Mazdaspeed branding and has not offered a Mazdaspeed trim since the 2013 Mazdaspeed3.

History

Mazdaspeed began in 1967 as "Mazda Sports Corner", an independent racing team and tuning operation run by Takayoshi Ohashi, who also ran Mazda's Tokyo distributor. They competed in numerous events at home and abroad, and they were also competitive at the 24 Hours of Le Mans races in the early 1980s, with the 717, 727, and 737. Mazda brought the racing team to Hiroshima in 1983, where the name became Mazdaspeed. In 1991, Mazdaspeed's 787B won at Le Mans, a feat no other Japanese team managed until Toyota did in 2018. After the FIA effectively outlawed the Wankel engine as well as Mercedes's Flat 12 engine the next year, the Mazdaspeed team raced one more year at Le Mans in a piston-powered car that came fourth, then turned away from professional racing and focused instead on enabling third-party competition of Mazda vehicles.

Mazda Motor Corporation assumed control of Mazdaspeed in 1999 as a tuning and performance parts operation within the company. It began offering performance-based versions of its vehicles to consumers in 2003.

Consumer models

In 2003, Mazda debuted its first consumer-offered Mazdaspeed vehicle model, the 2003 Mazdaspeed Protegé.  It was only released to the North American market as a performance upgrade to the Protegé MP3 and offered more power — from the MP3's  to  — by using a T25 Callaway-Garrett turbocharger and an intercooler. Some modifications included new front air dam and a new spoiler. The Japanese market Mazdaspeed Familia utilized a naturally aspirated FS-ZE 2.0L engine with higher compression and a revised  camshafts to produce  at 6800 rpm.

A year after, in 2004, another Mazdaspeed model was offered: the Mazdaspeed MX-5 Miata, initially released in the North American market, followed by the Australian and Japanese markets. Mazda soon realized that these high performance models could be successful outside of North America and would make the next vehicles available worldwide.

In the fall of 2009, Mazda released the second generation 2010 Mazdaspeed3.

Race branding
Mazda branded a selection of several racing series as the Mazdaspeed as well as a driver development ladder. This program, which began in 2005, was organized by Mazda and promoters offering presented season winners in a given series with an automatic ride in the next series on the ladder.

The sports car version, Road to (the Rolex) 24 (at Daytona), offered winners of the Global MX-5 Cup Spec Miata series a promotion to the Prototype Lites series, and the winner there was offered a ride in the Continental Tire Sports Car Challenge, with opportunities later on in the IMSA WeatherTech United Sports Car Championship.

The single-seater version, the Road to Indy, once offered drivers who won in any series a shootout where they could enter the US F2000 championship, advance to Pro Mazda, and then advance to Indy Lights, before earning a ride in the  IndyCar Series. Mazda discontinued its participation of the Road To Indy ladder system in 2018 to focus on its IMSA sportscar prototype program and grassroots racing contingency program under the Global MX-5 Cup

References

External links
 Mazdaspeed U.S. site
 MAZDASPEED Gen1 & Gen 2 Mazdaspeed 3 & 6 Forums 
 Mazdaspeed6 on Mazda6club
 All News Mazda & Mazdaspeed
 

Mazda
Auto parts suppliers of Japan
Automotive companies established in 1967
Official motorsports and performance division of automakers
Japanese auto racing teams
24 Hours of Le Mans teams
World Sportscar Championship teams
1967 establishments in Japan
WeatherTech SportsCar Championship teams